East Central Francophone Education Region No. 3, known in French as Conseil scolaire Centre-Est, is a French first language authority within the Canadian province of Alberta operated out of St. Paul.

 the board operates five schools in Plamondon, Lac la Biche, St. Paul, Bonnyville, and Cold Lake.

See also 
List of school authorities in Alberta

References

External links 

School districts in Alberta
County of St. Paul No. 19
French-language school districts in Canada